Paopi 19 - Coptic Calendar - Paopi 21

The twentieth day of the Coptic month of Paopi, the second month of the Coptic year.  On a common year, this day corresponds to October 17, of the Julian Calendar, and October 30, of the Gregorian Calendar. This day falls in the Coptic season of Peret, the season of emergence.

Commemorations

Saints 

 The departure of Saint John the Short

References 

Days of the Coptic calendar